The Institute of Solid State Physics may refer to:

 Institute of Solid State Physics (Bulgaria)
 Institute of Solid State Physics (China)
 Institute of Solid State Physics (Russia)
 Institute for Solid State Physics (Japan)